This is a list of schools in the Metropolitan Borough of Bolton in the English county of Greater Manchester.

State-funded schools

Primary schools

All Saints' CE Primary School, Farnworth
Beacon Primary School, Horwich
Beaumont Primary School, Deane
Bishop Bridgeman CE Primary School, Bolton
Blackrod CE/Methodist Primary School, Blackrod
Blackrod Primary School, Blackrod
Blackshaw Primary School, Breightmet
Bolton Parish Church CE Primary School, Bolton
Bolton St Catherine's Academy, Breightmet
Bowness Primary School, Little Lever
Brandwood Primary School, Bolton
Brownlow Fold Primary School, Halliwell
Castle Hill Primary School, Tonge Moor
Cherry Tree Primary School, Farnworth
Chorley New Road Primary Academy, Horwich
Church Road Primary School, Halliwell
Clarendon Primary School, Bolton
Claypool Primary School, Horwich
Devonshire Road Primary School, Bolton
Eagley Infant School, Eagley
Eagley Junior School, Eagley
Eatock Primary School, Westhoughton
Egerton Primary School, Egerton
Essa Primary School, Great Lever
The Ferns Primary Academy, Farnworth
Gaskell Community Primary School, Bolton
The Gates Primary School, Westhoughton
Gilnow Primary School, Bolton
Hardy Mill Primary School, Harwood
Harwood Meadows Primary School, Harwood
Haslam Park Primary School, Bolton
Heathfield Primary School, Daubhill
High Lawn Primary School, Sharples
Highfield Primary School, Farnworth
Holy Infant and St Anthony RC Primary School, Astley Bridge
Horwich Parish CE Primary School, Horwich
Johnson Fold Community Primary School, Halliwell
Kearsley West Primary School, Kearsley
Ladybridge Community Primary School, Deane
Lever Edge Primary School, Great Lever
Leverhulme Community Primary School, Breightmet
Lostock Primary School, Lostock
Markland Hill Primary School, Markland Hill
Masefield Primary School, Little Lever
Moorgate Primary School, Bolton
Mytham Primary School, Little Lever
The Oaks Primary School, Sharples
The Olive School, Bolton
The Olive Tree Primary School, Daubhill
Our Lady of Lourdes RC Primary School, Farnworth
Oxford Grove Primary School, Halliwell
Pikes Lane Primary School, Bolton
Prestolee Primary School, Prestolee
Queensbridge Primary School, Farnworth
Red Lane Primary School, Breightmet
Sacred Heart RC Primary School, Westhoughton
St Andrew's CE Primary School, Over Hulton
St Bartholomew's CE Primary School, Westhoughton
St Bede Academy, Bolton
St Bernard's RC Primary School, Deane
St Brendan's RC Primary School, Harwood
St Catherine's CE Primary School, Horwich
St Columba's RC Primary School, Tonge Moor
St Ethelbert's RC Primary School, Deane
St George's CE Primary School, Westhoughton
St Gregory's RC Primary School, Farnworth
St James' CE Primary School, Farnworth
St James' CE Primary School, Westhoughton
St John the Evangelist's RC Primary School, Bromley Cross
St John's CE Primary School, Kearsley
St Joseph's RC Primary School, Halliwell
St Mary's CE Primary School, Deane
St Mary's RC Primary School, Horwich
St Matthew's CE Primary School, Halliwell
St Matthew's CE Primary School, Little Lever
St Maxentius CE Primary School, Bradshaw
St Michael's CE Primary School, Great Lever
St Paul's CE Primary School, Astley Bridge
St Peter and St Paul RC Primary School, Bolton
St Peter's CE Primary School, Farnworth
St Peter's Smithills Dean CE Primary School, Smithills
St Saviour CE Primary School, Ringley
St Stephen and All Martyrs CE Primary School, Darcy Lever
St Stephen's CE Primary School, Kearsley
St Teresa's RC Primary School, Little Lever
St Thomas of Canterbury RC Primary School, Heaton
St Thomas' CE Primary School, Halliwell
St Thomas' CE Primary School, Westhoughton
St William of York RC Primary School, Great Lever
SS Osmund and Andrew's RC Primary School, Breightmet
SS Simon and Jude CE Primary School, Great Lever
Sharples Primary School, Sharples
Spindle Point Primary School, Kearsley
Sunning Hill Primary School, Daubhill
Tonge Moor Primary Academy, Tonge Moor
The Valley Community Primary School, Bolton
Walmsley CE Primary School, Egerton
Washacre Primary School, Westhoughton

Secondary schools

Bolton Muslim Girls' School, Bolton
Bolton St Catherine's Academy, Breightmet
Canon Slade School, Bradshaw
Eden Boys' School, Bolton
Essa Academy, Great Lever
Harper Green School, Farnworth
Kearsley Academy, Kearsley
King's Leadership Academy Bolton, Great Lever
Ladybridge High School, Deane
Little Lever School, Little Lever
Mount St Joseph School, Farnworth
Rivington and Blackrod High School, Horwich
St James's Church of England High School, Farnworth
St Joseph's RC High School, Horwich
Sharples School, Sharples
Smithills School, Smithills
Thornleigh Salesian College, Astley Bridge
Turton School, Bromley Cross
University Collegiate School, Bolton
Westhoughton High School, Westhoughton

Special and alternative schools

Firwood High School, Bolton
Forwards Centre, Breightmet
Green Fold School, Farnworth
Ladywood School, Little Lever
Lever Park School, Horwich
Park School Teaching Service, Breightmet
Rumworth School, Deane
Thomasson Memorial School, Bolton
Youth Challenge PRU, Bolton

Further education
Bolton College
Bolton Sixth Form College

Independent schools

Primary and preparatory schools
Al-Huda Primary School, Bolton
Clevelands Prep School, Bolton

Senior and all-through schools
Bolton Islamic Girls School, Bolton
Bolton School, Bolton
Darul Uloom Bolton, Deane
Lord's School, Bolton
Madrasatul Imam Muhammad Zakariya, Bolton

Special  and alternative schools
The Aspire Hub, Westhoughton
Birtenshaw, Bromley Cross
Raise Education and Wellbeing School, Great Lever
TLG Bolton, Farnworth

References

 Bolton Council School Directory
 Ofsted (Office for Standards in Education)

 
Bolton